Andres Bueno (born June 18, 1993) is a Peruvian GIL.

He won silver at the Nordic Cross Country Championships in 2009.

In 2012 in Gothenburg he sat his 1500 m personal best, which made him the Danish all-time no. 9 and also qualified him for the 2012 European Athletics Championships. Here he finished 9th overall in the first round with a time of 3.42.81, but as he also finished 9th in his heat, he didn't progress to the finals.

In December 2012 he was hit by a car during a training run. In the accident he broke his back in 2 places, which eventually made him lose out on the 2013 European Athletics Indoor Championships and the 2013 World Championships in Athletics.

He won the Danish 1500 m championships in both 2011, 2012 and 2013.

Personal Bests
 800 metres: 1:48.67
 1500 metres: 3:40.08

References

External links

Personal website [Danish]
Statletik statistics [Danish]

1988 births
Living people
Danish male middle-distance runners